Thomas Arthur Proulx is an American saxophonist, musician, actor, host, and music producer.  Born in Grand Rapids, Michigan, Proulx's love for music became apparent at age 3 when he started playing the piano by ear.  He later taught himself the saxophone, which soon became his primary instrument.  He attended Grandville High School in Grandville, Michigan performing as a saxophonist in the high school jazz band.  He later graduated from Western Michigan University with a bachelor's degree in jazz studies and a master's degree in saxophonist performance.  Following his graduation, Proulx toured internationally as a headlining entertainer on cruise ships.  

In 2013, Proulx moved to Los Angeles, California where he landed a job in television production at ITV Studios.  It is there where he learned the ropes of film and television production and began connecting with producers in the Hollywood entertainment industry.  He later began to develop his own web show, Hollywood Music Circuit, created to expose the behind-the-scenes action of the music industry in Los Angeles. Mentored by of one of Hollywood's top talent managers and hosting guru, Marki Costello, Tommy began studying the careers of the most successful television personalities in the business, Dick Clark, Casey Kasem, and Ryan Seacrest. Proulx has also appeared as an actor and model for several commercial and print campaigns including Cheez-It, Hinokiya, Cristal Beer, and Nestea.

As a saxophonists, Proulx's recording credits span across many genres and has landed him his first contribution to be nominated for a Grammy Award, Marvin Sapp's, Here I Am.  In the summer of 2018, Proulx released his debut self-produced album, SaxTrax aimed toward a younger generation by redefining the saxophone as a tasteful addition to today's urban pop sounds.

References

Living people
Year of birth missing (living people)